T-cell leukemia homeobox protein 1 is a protein that in humans is encoded by the TLX1 gene, which was initially named HOX11.

Interactions 

TLX1 has been shown to interact with PPP1CC, PPP2CB and PPP2CA.

References

Further reading